Siglé is a town in the Siglé Department of Boulkiemdé Province in central western Burkina Faso. It is the capital of Siglé Department and has a population of 2,224.

References

External links
Satellite map at Maplandia.com

Populated places in Boulkiemdé Province